The 1880 State of the Union Address was written by Rutherford B. Hayes, the 19th United States president.  In it he said these words,
 "Continued opposition to the full and free enjoyment of the rights of citizenship conferred upon the colored people by the recent amendments to the Constitution still prevails in several of the late slaveholding States."  It was given on December 6, 1880, to both houses of the 46th United States Congress.

References 

State of the Union addresses
Presidency of Rutherford B. Hayes
46th United States Congress
State of the Union Address
State of the Union Address
State of the Union Address
State of the Union Address
December 1880 events
State of the Union